Sukkur railway station is a railway station located in Sukkur, Sindh, Pakistan.

A Dak bungalow, now used as a resthouse, is located here.

History
The railway station was built in 1891, when Sukkur was part of British India.

Train routes
The routes are Sukkur from linked with Karachi, Lahore, Faisalabad, Rawalpindi, Peshawar,  Quetta, Multan, Hyderabad, Rohri, Jacobabad, Bahawalpur, Dera Ghazi Khan, Kot Adu, Gujrat, Larkana, Gujranwala, Khanewal, Nawabshah, Attock, Dadu,  and Nowshera.

Train services from Sukkur 
The following trains serve this station:

See also
 List of railway stations in Pakistan
 Pakistan Railways

References

Railway stations in Sukkur District
Railway stations on Rohri–Chaman Railway Line
Tourist attractions in Sukkur
1891 establishments in British India
Railway stations in Sindh

}